Ulvipinara is a genus of moths belonging to the subfamily Tortricinae of the family Tortricidae. It consists of only one species, Ulvipinara pulvinaria, which is found in Ecuador.

The wingspan is about 19.5 mm. The ground colour of the forewings is brownish cream, with pale brownish suffusions and slightly darker spots and strigulae. The markings are reduced to pale brown remnants. The hindwings are dirty cream, tinged with brownish on the periphery.

Etymology 
The generic name is an anagram of the name of the type-species. The specific name refers to the presence of a strongly developed pulvinus.

See also 
 List of Tortricidae genera

References

External links 
tortricidae.com

Euliini
Tortricidae genera